José Alexis Rojas Díaz (born August 9, 1972 in Bogotá) is a Colombian former road racing cyclist, who currently works as a directeur sportif for UCI Continental team .

Major results

1995
 1st Overall Clasica Alcaldía de Pasca
1996
 2nd Overall Vuelta a Colombia
1998
 10th Overall Vuelta a Colombia
2000
 1st Overall Vuelta de Higuito
2001
 1st Overall Clásica de Fusagasugá
2002
 Vuelta a la Independencia Nacional
1st Stages 7 & 9
 1st Stage 2 Vuelta a Colombia
 1st Stage 1 Doble Copacabana Grand Prix Fides
 9th Overall Clásico RCN
2003
 1st Stage 1 Clásica de Fusagasugá
 1st Stage 3 Vuelta a Antioquia
2004
 1st Overall Vuelta al Tolima
1st Stage 2
 3rd Overall Doble Sucre Potosí GP Cemento Fancesa
 3rd Overall Vuelta a Chiriquí

References

External links

1972 births
Living people
Colombian male cyclists
Vuelta a Colombia stage winners
Sportspeople from Bogotá